Grandview Plaza is a city in Geary County, Kansas, United States.  As of the 2020 census, the population of the city was 1,697.

History
Grandview Plaza was founded in 1963.

Geography
Grandview Plaza is located at  (39.031249, -96.794751).

Climate
The climate in this area is characterized by hot, humid summers and generally mild to cool winters.  According to the Köppen Climate Classification system, Grandview Plaza has a humid subtropical climate, abbreviated "Cfa" on climate maps.

Demographics

Grandview Plaza is part of the Manhattan, Kansas Metropolitan Statistical Area.

2010 census
As of the census of 2010, there were 1,560 people, 651 households, and 430 families residing in the city. The racial makeup of the city was 72.1% White, 11.4% African American, 1.2% Native American, 1.9% Asian, 0.8% Pacific Islander, 3.7% from other races, and 8.9% from two or more races. Hispanic or Latino of any race were 11.5% of the population.

There were 651 households, of which 37.8% had children under the age of 18 living with them, 48.2% were married couples living together, 13.1% had a female householder with no husband present, 4.8% had a male householder with no wife present, and 33.9% were non-families. 26.6% of all households were made up of individuals, and 4% had someone living alone who was 65 years of age or older. The average household size was 2.36 and the average family size was 2.85.

The median age in the city was 25.3 years. 25.8% of residents were under the age of 18; 23.5% were between the ages of 18 and 24; 27% were from 25 to 44; 17.4% were from 45 to 64; and 6.3% were 65 years of age or older. The gender makeup of the city was 51.6% male and 48.4% female.

2000 census
As of the census of 2000, there were 1,184 people, 458 households, and 333 families residing in the city. The racial makeup of the city was 78.12% White, 9.04% African American, 1.10% Native American, 3.46% Asian, 0.25% Pacific Islander, 3.46% from other races, and 4.56% from two or more races. Hispanic or Latino of any race were 6.08% of the population.

There were 458 households, out of which 38.6% had children under the age of 18 living with them, 52.0% were married couples living together, 17.0% had a female householder with no husband present, and 27.1% were non-families. 19.7% of all households were made up of individuals, and 3.5% had someone living alone who was 65 years of age or older. The average household size was 2.59 and the average family size was 2.92.

In the city, the population was spread out, with 29.3% under the age of 18, 12.6% from 18 to 24, 33.8% from 25 to 44, 18.0% from 45 to 64, and 6.3% who were 65 years of age or older. The median age was 30 years. For every 100 females, there were 96.4 males. For every 100 females age 18 and over, there were 95.6 males.

The median income for a household in the city was $31,033, and the median income for a family was $32,368. Males had a median income of $26,058 versus $17,344 for females. The per capita income for the city was $13,022. About 12.9% of families and 13.3% of the population were below the poverty line, including 17.4% of those under age 18 and none of those age 65 or over.

Education
The community is served by Geary County USD 475 public school district.

References

Further reading

External links

 City of Grandview Plaza
 Grandview Plaza - Directory of Public Officials
 Grandview Plaza city map, KDOT

Cities in Kansas
Cities in Geary County, Kansas
Manhattan, Kansas metropolitan area